Graham A. Nelson (born 1968) is a British mathematician, poet, and the creator of the Inform design system for creating interactive fiction (IF) games. He has authored several IF games, including Curses (1993) and Jigsaw (1995).

Education
In 1994, Nelson received a Ph.D. in mathematics from the University of Oxford under the supervision of Simon Donaldson.

Writing
Nelson co-edited Oxford Poetry and in 1997 received an Eric Gregory Award from the Society of Authors for his poetry.  he was managing editor of Legenda, the imprint of the Modern Humanities Research Association (MHRA).

Interactive fiction
Nelson is the creator of the Inform design system for creating interactive fiction (IF) games. He has also authored several IF games, including Curses (1993) and Jigsaw (1995), using the experience of writing Curses in particular to expand the range of verbs that Inform is capable of understanding.

Personal life
Nelson is married to IF writer Emily Short.

Games

Written 
 Curses (1993, Z-code)
 Deja Vu (1993, Z-code)
 Balances (1994, Z-code)
 Jigsaw (1995, Z-code)
 The Meteor, the Stone and a Long Glass of Sherbet (as "Angela M. Horns", 1996, Z-code), for IF Comp 1996 (1st place). Was a finalist for Best Individual Puzzle, Best Puzzles, Best Writing, and Best Game at the XYZZY Awards 1996
 The Tempest (1997, Z-code), for IF Comp 1997 (25th place). Winner of Best Use of Medium at the XYZZY Awards 1997.
 Time and Dwarves (1998, Inform source code). Demo code for Inform programmers.
 Ruins (as "Angela M. Horns", 2001)
 The Reliques of Tolti-Aph (2006, Z-code)

Ported 
 Adventure
 Adventureland
 Crobe
 Fyleet
 Quest for the Sangraal

Other works 
 (1995) "The Craft of the Adventure" (2nd ed)
 (1997) Singularities, with Polly Clark and Tim Kendall. Oxford: Hubble Press. . Anthology of poetry
 (2001) Inform Designers Manual (4th ed), with Gareth Rees. Placet Solutions,

References

External links 
 Homepage of Graham Nelson
 Graham Nelson's entry in Baf's Guide to IF archive
 Nelson's Index to Oxford Poetry 
 IFWiki's page for Graham Nelson
 Graham Nelson's talk on Inform Past, Present and Future, June 2018
 Graham Nelson's brief autobiography as of 2019, published by computer entertainment historian Jimmy Maher

1968 births
Alumni of Selwyn College, Cambridge
British video game designers
British video game programmers
English mathematicians
Fellows of St Anne's College, Oxford
Interactive fiction writers
Living people
English male poets